This is a list of Dixon of Dock Green television episodes from the series that ran from 1955 until 1976. It had twenty-two series of original episodes. Series one to fifteen aired in black and white, series sixteen to twenty-two were aired in colour. A total of 432 episodes were produced; 400 are missing.

Series overview

Episodes

Series 1 (1955)

Series 2 (1956)

Series 3 (1957)

Series 4 (1957–58)

Series 5 (1958–59)

Series 6 (1959–60)

Series 7 (1960–61)

Series 8 (1961–62)

Series 9 (1962–63)

Series 10 (1963–64)

Series 11 (1964–65)

Series 12 (1965–66)

Series 13 (1966)

Series 14 (1967–68)

Series 15 (1968)

Series 16 (1969)
This series was the first to be produced in colour.

Series 17 (1970–71)

Series 18 (1971–72)

Series 19 (1972)

Series 20 (1973–74)

Series 21 (1975)

Series 22 (1976)
This series is the only series to have no episodes missing. This was the final series.

Lists of British drama television series episodes